Ystradfellte Reservoir is a water storage reservoir on the Afon Dringarth in the upland area of Fforest Fawr within the Brecon Beacons National Park in South Wales. It lies just north of the village of Ystradfellte in the county of Powys at OS Grid ref SN 946178.

Construction 
The reservoir was constructed between 1907 and 1914 by Neath Rural District Council for the supply of water. Limestone was obtained from Penderyn Quarry and puddle clay was excavated from the glacial till at nearby Cilhepste Coed. Sandstone may have been sourced from Gwaun Hepste just east of Ystradfellte.

References

External links 
Images of reservoir and area on Geograph website

Reservoirs in Powys
Dams in Powys
Reservoirs in the Brecon Beacons National Park
Reservoirs in Wales